Jiao Li (born April 1955) is the former president of China Central Television (CCTV).

Career
Jiao Li was formerly the vice minister of the Propaganda Department of the Communist Party of China.
After being removed as president of China Central Television in November 2011, he was transferred to the General Administration of Press and Publications (GAPP). In 2012 Jiao LI has been dismissed as deputy director of GAPP over rumored links to corruption and sex scandals.

References

Chinese government officials
People from Zhengding County
1955 births
Living people